The Railway Museum, also known as the Rail Transport Museum, is situated in Bassendean, Western Australia. It is run by the Western Australian division of the Australian Railway Historical Society (ARHS), which is called Rail Heritage WA.

In the early days of operation it had in places been known as the Western Australian Rail Transport Museum, and more recently, Rail Transport Museum.  On the internet and social media, it has been referred in variants with qualifiers of the location name such as the Bassendean Rail Museum  and Rail Heritage Museum Bassendean.

The standard name is currently utilised as the Railway Museum.

Collection 
It has the most comprehensive collection of heritage steam locomotives and rolling stock in Western Australia.
It was originally developed in 1969, and officially opened in November 1974 by the Western Australian Minister for Transport Ray O'Connor.
Diesel Locomotives

Steam Locomotives - include representatives of most classes that operated in the WAGR

Passenger carriages

Other rolling stock

Events 

Various annual events have been held over time:

Steamfest 
Railfest, which has included active steam and diesel displays
 Annual open days

It is also the location of the West Australian Model Railway Club.

It has a related museum in Boyanup - the South-West Rail and Heritage Centre.

References

External links 

Bassendean, Western Australia
Museums in Perth, Western Australia
Railway museums in Western Australia
1974 establishments in Australia